California Proposition 60 was an amendment of the Constitution of California relating to property tax assessments for older homeowners. It was proposed by the California State Legislature and approved by voters in a referendum held on November 4, 1986.

The amendment allows homeowners over the age of 55 to transfer the assessed value of their present home to a replacement home if the replacement home is located in the same county, is of equal or lesser value than the original property, and purchased or newly constructed within two years of the sale of the present property.

See also 
 California Proposition 13 (1978)
 California Proposition 90 (1988)

References

External links
 Proposition 60 Transfer of Property Tax Base for Senior Citizens
 Exclusions from Reappraisal – Frequently Asked Questions about Propositions 60/90  published by the California State Board of Equalization

1986 California ballot propositions
Taxation in California
1986